The Walkerjet Simon is a family of Czech paramotor designs that were designed by Victor Procházka and produced by Walkerjet of Třemošná for powered paragliding. Now out of production, when they were available the aircraft were supplied complete and ready-to-fly.

Design and development
The series was designed to comply with the US FAR 103 Ultralight Vehicles rules as well as European regulations. It features a paraglider-style wing, single-place or two-place-in-tandem accommodation and a single  Simonini Mini 2 Plus engine in pusher configuration with a 2.2:1 ratio reduction drive and a  diameter two-bladed wooden propeller. The aircraft are built from a combination of bolted aluminium and 4130 steel tubing. The propeller cage can be dismantled for ground transport or storage.

As is the case with all paramotors, take-off and landing is accomplished by foot. Inflight steering is accomplished via handles that actuate the canopy brakes, creating roll and yaw.

Variants
Simon
Single-seat model with a  Simonini Mini 2 Plus engine in pusher configuration with a 2.2:1 ratio reduction drive and a  diameter two-bladed wooden propeller.
Simon +
Single-seat model with a  Simonini Mini 2 Plus engine in pusher configuration with a 2.2:1 ratio reduction drive and a  diameter two-bladed wooden propeller.
Simon Compact
Single-seat model with a  Simonini Mini 2 Plus engine in pusher configuration with a 2.2:1 ratio reduction drive and a  diameter two-bladed wooden propeller.
Simon Tandem
Two-seat model with a  Simonini Mini 2 Plus engine in pusher configuration with a 2.2:1 ratio reduction drive and a  diameter two-bladed wooden propeller.

Specifications (Simon)

References

Simon
2000s Czech ultralight aircraft
Single-engined pusher aircraft
Paramotors